Berrigan  is a town on the Riverina Highway  in the Riverina region of New South Wales, Australia. Berrigan is in the Berrigan Shire local government area and contains the Berrigan Shire Council offices.

History
The earliest association with settlement in the area comes in 1849 through the agency of Momalong Station, where Robert Rand had settled some 22.5 thousand acres.

The location of the town was formerly swamp land. The unfavourable location was chosen as the mail run from Corowa to Murray Hut ran through Berrigan on much the same location as the present Riverina Highway, and the road from Jerilderie lies on the same route now as it did back then. The Berrigan Post Office opened on 11 May 1884.

In 1888, the first hotel - Berrigan Hotel - was built on the intersection of the two main roads through to town, with other stores rapidly following along Chanter Street. This hotel still stands today, although it is now a private residence. Other hotels include the Momalong Hotel, also now a private residence, and the Federal Hotel and Royal Hotel, both still active.

Berrigan was officially proclaimed on 31 May 1890, and this only increased the establishment of the commercial section of the town, as well as the residential. The population in 1891 had reached 254, which more than doubled by Federation.

The railway officially opened in late 1896, being the first pioneer light railway in the colony.

The first issue of the Berrigan Advocate was published on Friday, 23 October 1891. The paper eventually merged with the Finley Mail and Tocumwal Guardian & Riverina Stock Journal, becoming the Southern Riverina News in 1970.

Climate
Berrigan experiences a subtropical semi-arid climate (Köppen: BSh, Trewartha: BSak); with hot summers and cool winters; and moderately low precipitation year round.

Involvement in federation

Because of its location near the border with Victoria, Berrigan was one of the pioneers in the push for an Australian Federation. It was at the suggestion of the Berrigan Australian Natives' Association that the first meeting of the Federation League was held.  Due to its centrality, the meeting was held in Corowa.

Education

Berrigan has a state primary school, with the Catholic primary school having closed at the end of 2020. The nearest high school is in Finley,  to the west. Oaklands has a Central School, that is a part of the Riverina Access Partnership.

Sport

Popular sports in Berrigan include Australian rules football (the town has a team competing in the Picola & District Football League), netball, golf, bowls, and tennis.  Horse racing is also popular, with the Berrigan Gold Cup — held on the same day as the Victoria Derby — attracting a large crowd.

Other attractions
Held annual on the Sunday of the October long week is the Berrigan Agricultural Show, which has been in existence for over 120 years. The annual Show & Shine is held in January. A major event previously held in the town was the annual Canola Festival, celebrating the importance of canola to the region. Although this event has since ceased, canola is still an important part of the landscape.

It is also close to the Murray River communities of Barooga and Tocumwal. Located between Berrigan and Barooga is 'The Drop', which is Australia's first hydroelectric power station on an irrigation canal, the Mulwala Canal. The power station had a generating capacity of 2.5 MW of electricity.

Once a thriving town with four pubs and the golf club, it has since been reduced to two pubs and the club.

The aging population is well catered for in such a small town, with world class hospice and respite facilities provided. While the town thrives on the farming income generated in the district, it is a very modern, and family-friendly town. In 2013, an Alzheimer's wing was opened, catering to the numerous residents suffering from the disease.

The localities of Boomanoomana and Mount Gwynne are about 30 km. south.

Nearby towns
 Finley
 Barooga
 Tocumwal
 Jerilderie
 Oaklands
 Cobram
 Mulwala
Savernake

See also
 Berrigan Shire
 Berrigan Football Club

References

External links

Berrigan Railway Station
Better In Berrigan
Berrigan Shire Council
Berrigan NSW

Towns in Berrigan Shire
Towns in the Riverina
Towns in New South Wales